The following is a list of conflicts involving the militant group known as al-Qaeda throughout its various incarnations. The group currently controls portions of territory in Syria, Somalia and Yemen and has taken part in many battles and wars.

Wars
 War on Terror
 Soviet–Afghan War (from 1988)
 Afghan Civil War (1989–92)
 Afghan Civil War (1992–96)
 Bosnian War
 Afghan Civil War (1996–2001)
 War in Afghanistan (2001–2021)
 Tajikistani Civil War
 Al-Qaeda insurgency in Yemen
 Yemeni Civil War (2015-present)
 Maghreb insurgency
 Northern Mali conflict
 Iraq War
 Iraqi insurgency
 War in North-West Pakistan
 First Somali Islamist War
 Second Somali Islamist War
 Factional violence in Libya (2011–14)
 Second Libyan Civil War
 Syrian Civil War
 Military intervention against ISIL
 American-led intervention in Syria

Battles

See also
 List of wars and battles involving ISIL

References

Al-Qaeda activities